Samuel Duncon (fl. 1600–1659) was a British political writer, a citizen of Ipswich, of considerable means, and devoted to the parliamentary side in the English Civil War.

Life
In 1640, he was "strayed three times" for refusing to pay ship-money. 
He was ordered to march with the king's forces against the Scots; but he was allowed, after some troublesome negotiations, to hire a substitute. Processes were also begun against him in the commissaries' court and the court of arches. This caused him to repair several times to London, and led finally to his being "damnified about £300". Duncon complained to the parliament, but without result. When the English Civil War broke out, he as well as his father and father-in-law, aided the parliament with many contributions, by raising troops (which brought him into direct communication with Cromwell), and by acting as high collector of assessments until 1651. Duncon seems finally to have settled in London, and to have died about the time of the Restoration.

Works
Duncon wrote:
 Several Propositions of publick concernment presented to his Excellency the Lord Generall Cromwell, 1651.
 Several Proposals offered by a Friend to Peace and Truth to the serious consideration of the keepers of the Liberties of the People of England, 1659.

The chief end of these tracts is (besides the recital of the author's sacrifices for the Commonwealth) towards the "settling of peacemakers in every city and county of this nation". These peacemakers were to be the "most understanding plain honest-harted men" that the people of the district could find. Their function was to be to settle all sorts of disputes, and thus avoid as far as possible the necessity for law courts.

Notes

References
Attribution
 Endnotes:
Works
Addit. manuscripts 21418, f. 270, 21419, f. 145.

Year of birth missing
Year of death missing
17th-century English writers
17th-century English male writers
Writers from Ipswich
English political writers